Holt Fleet Bridge, also known as Holt Bridge, is a cast-iron arch bridge over the River Severn, at Holt in Worcestershire, England. It is Grade II listed, and is similar to Telford's Galton Bridge, which is a Grade I listed structure that spans his BCN New Main Line canal at Smethwick.

The bridge was built with five cast-iron ribs, with X-braced spandrels, as were several of Telford's bridges. It was strengthened in 1928. when the upper and lower parts of each rib and some of the diagonal struts above them were encased in concrete. The road deck was rebuilt in reinforced concrete and widened at the same time.

Semicircular arches at each end, built in red sandstone, allow for the passage of riverbank foot-traffic and floodwater.

See also 
Crossings of the River Severn

References

External links

photos of Holt Fleet Bridge and surrounding area on geograph

The Holt Fleet - a historic restaurant adjacent to the Holt Fleet Bridge

Bridges across the River Severn
Bridges in Worcestershire
Bridges completed in 1828
Grade II listed buildings in Worcestershire
Bridges by Thomas Telford